Antimony is a chemical element with symbol Sb and atomic number 51.

Antimony may also refer to:

 Antimony, Utah, a town in Garfield County, Utah
 Antimony Peak, peak located in the San Emigdio Mountains of California
 Antimony Carver, a character in the webcomic Gunnerkrigg Court
 Antimony Price, a character in the InCryptid novel series

See also

 Antinomy
 Sb (disambiguation)
 Isotopes of antimony